Schrimpf is a surname. Notable people with the surname include:

Charles M. Schrimpf (1890–1932), American politician and businessman
Georg Schrimpf (1889–1938), German painter and graphic artist
Ronald D. Schrimpf (born 1959), American electrical engineer and scientist

See also
Schimpf
Schrempf (surname)
Schrumpf